South Leaze is a hamlet within the Borough of Swindon, Wiltshire, United Kingdom. It is south of the nearby village of Toothill and is nearby to the Mannington Retail Park & the National Cycle Route 45 passes through the hamlet. There were cottages in the hamlet as late as 2008.

In 2021, the highway infrastructure scheme from Swindon Borough Council built a tunnel underneath the M4 motorway; this will form part of the eventual connection between Hay Lane and the residential development of Wichelstowe. It has not yet been announced when the road connection linking Wichelstowe and South Leaze will be completed.

References

Swindon